Kirkham is a suburb of the Macarthur Region of Sydney in the state of New South Wales, Australia in Camden Council. The suburb is largely undeveloped at present and possibly will remain so since much of it is on low-lying flood-prone land.

History
The area now known as Kirkham was originally home to the Muringong, southernmost of the Darug people. In 1805 John Macarthur established his property at Camden where he raised merino sheep. In 1810, explorer John Oxley was granted  nearby, which he named Kirkham.

Kirkham has figured prominently in the 2013 - 2018 TV series A Place to Call Home. The fictional house known as Ash Park is actually a property called Camelot, which is situated on Oxley's old property at Kirkham. Oxley's original home was called Kirkham, after his birthplace in Yorkshire. The stables are all that remain.

Camelot was designed by the Canadian-born architect John Horbury Hunt for James White, New South Wales politician and great-uncle of Patrick White.  It was built circa 1888, on the site of Oxley's old Kirkham Mill, and partly on its foundations. It was originally called Kirkham. The name was changed to Camelot by a new owner, Frances Faithful-Anderson, in 1900. When she saw the house, she was reminded of lines in Tennyson's poem The Lady of Shallot, which make a reference to Camelot. The house is heritage-listed at the state and federal level.

People

Demographics
In the 2006 Australian Bureau of Statistics Census, the suburb of Kirkham had a population of 655 people. Like other suburbs in the Camden area, the people are very homogeneous with 84% Australian born and the only other countries of birth greater than 1% being England (5%) and Scotland (2%). The average weekly income of $646 is substantially higher than the national average ($466) but the average monthly mortgage repayments ($2694) are more than double the national average ($1300).

Governance 
Kirkham is part of the south ward of Camden Council represented by Eva Campbell, Paul Farrow and Peter Sidgreaves. Theresa Fedeli is currently the local mayor. The suburb is contained within the federal electorate of Macarthur, represented by former ultra-marathon runner Pat Farmer (Liberal), and the state electorate of Camden, currently held by former mayor Geoff Corrigan (Labor).

References

External links

  [CC-By-SA]

Suburbs of Sydney
Camden Council (New South Wales)